Passai (拔塞, katakana パッサイ), also Bassai (バッサイ), is the name of a group of kata practiced in different styles of martial arts, including karate and various Korean martial arts, including Taekwondo, Tang Soo Do, and Soo Bahk Do. There are several variations of these kata, including Passai sho (拔塞小) or minor Passai and Passai dai (拔塞大) or major Passai. The kata are generally known as Passai in Okinawan styles of karate and Bassai in Japanese styles, although Gichin Funakoshi originally spells the name of this form パッサイ (Passai).  In Korean, the kata have several names: Bassahee, Bal Se, Pal Che, Palsek, Bal Sae, Ba Sa Hee, and Bal Sak. The kata focus on the idea of changing disadvantage into advantage by strong and courageous response, switching blocks and differing degrees of power. The feeling of kata should be precise, with fast execution of technique and attention given to appropriate balance between speed and power. Passai kata are usually classed as intermediate.

History
This form has been used and practiced in many cultures, including China, Ryūkyū, Japan and Korea.  The origins of this kata are obscure, however there are several theories as to its history. Some researchers believe the Passai kata is related to Chinese Leopard and Lion boxing forms, with some sequences bearing a resemblance to Leopard boxing (the opening blocking / striking movement in cross-legged stance) whereas others are more representative of Lion boxing (open handed techniques and stomping actions). Okinawan karate researcher Akio Kinjo believes that the name originates in the Chinese bàoshī/豹獅 meaning "leopard-lion" which is pronounced "Bá-săi" or "pà-sai" in some Chinese dialects. Here are the spellings of 豹獅 in several Chinese dialects:

Other historians have noticed the resemblance between some parts of Passai and Wuxing Quan ("Five Element Fist") Kung Fu.  Yet another theory as to the naming of the kata is that it may represent a person's name.

In his 1922 book, Gichin Funakoshi names the form Passai/パッサイ and provides no Kanji characters to go along with this name. The same "Passai" spelling is used by Motobu Chōki in 1926. By 1936, Funakoshi switches to calling the form Bassai/バッサイ but uses the characters "拔塞" which he spells as "Passai/パッサイ".  "Bassai/Bá-sāi" would be the Chinese pronunciation of "拔塞", which in Japanese would be pronounced "Batsu-sai/ バツサイ".

Whereas the Japanese meaning of "拔(batsu)" is "to pull out or to extract", in Chinese "拔(bá)" can mean "to seize or capture"; and "塞(sai/soku)" means a "place of strategic importance" or fort.  Thus Funkaoshi's characters of "Bá sāi(拔塞)" would mean "to seize or capture" a "place of importance/fortress." However the 1973 translation of Karate-do Kyohan lists Funakoshi's explanation of the form name as "Breaking through an enemy's fortress."

The Korean Hangul spelling of the Hanja "拔塞" is "bal-chae (발채) ".  Hwang Kee spells the form as both Basahee and Bassai, stating "the original name of the form is Pal Che (拔柴)". Both Hwang Kee claiming the form is affiliated with the "So Rim Sa" and Gichin Funakoshi  who indicates the form is of "Shōrin-ryū /少林流" attribute the form to Chinese Shaolin/少林 styles, although originally, Funakoshi spelled this as "昭林流".

Versions
Of the Okinawan versions of Passai, a clear evolutionary link can be seen from Matsumura no Passai (named after the legendary Sokon Matsumura), to Oyadomari no Passai (named after the Tomari-te karate master Kokan Oyadomari), and then onto the Passai of Anko Itosu who popularized karate by introducing it into the curriculum of Okinawan schools. The Matsumura version has a distinct Chinese flavour, whereas the Oyadomari version is more "Okinawanized". It was further modified by Itosu, and is thought to have created a "sho" (Passai sho) form of it. Gichin Funakoshi of Shotokan took it to Japan and taught them as Bassai dai and Bassai sho. The Tomari style which incorporated Oyadomari no Passai was passed down the Oyadomari family for three generations, originally taught by a Chinese living in Tomari (possibly named Anan), who "used very light techniques". Sokon Matsumura also learned Chinese boxing from the military attaches Ason and Iwah at Fuchou.

The Okinawans did not have a clear definition for the name "Passai" for Funakoshi to translate into Japanese, so he substituted it with a similar-sounding kanji, "Bassai". This can be literally translated to mean "extract from a fortress" or "remove an obstruction". This is thought to be in reference to the power with which the kata should be executed, emphasizing energy generation from the hips and waist. However, the designation of Bassai by the Japanese does not appear to have a direct relation to movements in the kata or its origins.

The Shorin-ryu version of Passai bears a close resemblance to Oyadomari no Passai, and is a much softer kata than Shotokan's Bassai dai. Further evidence that Passai has roots in Tomari city is that Passai dai starts with the right fist covered by the left hand, like other kata thought to have originated there, such as Jitte, Jion, Jiin and Empi. This hand gesture is a common salutation in China. However, there is some contention between researchers as to if there was a separate Tomari school of karate.

The suffix -dai means "large" and -sho "small". Hence, Passai sho is a shorter variation on Passai and also bears some resemblances to Bassai dai, indicating this kata may have been born out of combining elements of Passai and Passai sho. One notable point is that bunkai describes it as a defense against a bo.

Itosu is thought to have created this from a version of Bassai practiced in Shuri city. To confuse matters even more Bassai Sho is written exactly the same way as a Chinese form known as Ba Ji Xiao which has a counterpart form known as Ba Ji Da (from the Ba Ji Ch’uan style), so perhaps this kata pair and the Dai-Sho naming scheme originates from China, invalidating the claim Itosu authored most of the -sho kata.

See also
 Karate kata

References

Further reading
 Bishop, M. Okinawan Karate (Tuttle, Boston, 1999).

Karate kata